The 2019 Vankor 350 was a NASCAR Gander Outdoors Truck Series race held on March 29, 2019, at Texas Motor Speedway in Fort Worth, Texas. Contested over 147 laps on the 1.5-mile (2.4 km) intermediate quad-oval, it was the fifth race of the 2019 NASCAR Gander Outdoors Truck Series season.

Entry list

Practice

First practice

Final practice

Qualifying

Qualifying results

 Bayley Currey's truck caught fire during the first practice and the team withdrew before qualifying.

Race

Stage Results

Stage One
Laps: 35

Stage Two
Laps: 35

Final Stage Results

Stage Three
Laps: 77

References

NASCAR races at Texas Motor Speedway
Vankor 350
Vankor 350
2010s in Fort Worth, Texas